Sicca means dryness. It may refer to:

Medical
 Sjögren syndrome, an autoimmune disorder
 Xerostomia, dryness of the mouth
 Keratoconjunctivitis sicca, also known as "dry eye syndrome"

Places
 Sicca Veneria, Tunisian city from classical times